Ladrillar, also known by its extremaduran name Lairillal, is a municipality located in Las Hurdes, province of Cáceres, Extremadura, Spain. According to the 2006 census (INE), the municipality has a population of 234 inhabitants.

Alquerías
The following alquerías (small settlements of a few houses) are within the municipal limits of Ladrillar (traditional variants of the name are in brackets):
Cabezo (Cabezu)
Las Mestas, located in the lower part of the Valle de Las Batuecas, at the confluence of the Batuecas River and the Ladrillar River, it belongs geographically to the Las Batuecas region, even though it is historically part of Las Hurdes.
Riomalo de Arriba (Riomalu d’Arriba)

History 
According to old documents Ladrillar was formerly named "El Adrial".
In former times the seat of the municipality was in the El Cabezo alquería and Ladrillar was part of the Nuñomoral area. People of Ladrillar are affectionately known to the locals of other nearby villages as "Veleguines", which means nervous, restless persons.

See also
Las Hurdes

References

Municipalities in the Province of Cáceres
Las Hurdes